Zala Vindišar (born 31 May 2000) is a Slovenian footballer who plays as a forward for ŽNK Olimpija Ljubljana and the Slovenia women's national team.

Club career
Vindišar has played for ŽNK Radomlje and Olimpija Ljubljana in Slovenia.

International career
Vindišar made her senior debut for Slovenia on 21 January 2019 as an 87th-minute substitution during a 4–0 friendly away win over Montenegro.

References

External links

2000 births
Living people
Slovenian women's footballers
Women's association football forwards
ŽNK Radomlje players
ŽNK Olimpija Ljubljana players
Slovenia women's international footballers